David Adams and Jared Palmer were the defending champions but did not compete that year.

Julian Knowle and Nenad Zimonjić won in the final 7–6(7–1), 6–3 against Michael Kohlmann and Rainer Schüttler.

Seeds

  Mahesh Bhupathi /  Max Mirnyi (semifinals)
  František Čermák /  Leoš Friedl (first round)
  Tomáš Cibulec /  Pavel Vízner (quarterfinals)
  Jonathan Erlich /  Andy Ram (quarterfinals)

Draw

External links
 2003 St. Petersburg Open Doubles Draw

St. Petersburg Open
2003 ATP Tour
2003 in Russian tennis